Jamaal Jones  (born August 24, 1990), better known by his stage name ELHAE (pronounced "ɛl a", acronym for Every Life Has An Ending), is an American singer and songwriter. ELHAE was born in Minot, North Dakota, but moved around a lot as a child because his father was in the military. His family eventually settled in Warner Robins, GA and ELHAE spent the summers in Savannah, GA.

In 2015, he was nominated for two rap albums at the Dove Awards, with Andy Mineo's "Uncomfortable" and Tedashii's "This Time Around" for Rap / Hip Hop Album of the Year, being a joint winner with Andy's album.

Discography

Albums
 All Have Fallen (2016)
 Trouble in Paradise (2019)

EPs
 Aura (2015)
 Aura II (2017)
 Aura III (2021)

References

American singer-songwriters
Rappers from Georgia (U.S. state)
Musicians from Savannah, Georgia
Living people
1990 births